Kharabeh-ye Chul Arkh (also Romanized as Kharābeh-ye Chūl Arkh; also known as Kharābeh-ye Chehel Arkh) is a village in Gorgin Rural District, Korani District, Bijar County, Kurdistan Province, Iran. At the 2006 census, its population was 170, in 39 families. The village is populated by Azerbaijanis.

References 

Towns and villages in Bijar County
Azerbaijani settlements in Kurdistan Province